Yves Dauge (born 26 January 1935) is a former member of the Senate of France.  He represented the Communauté de communes de Rivière-Chinon-Saint-Benoist-la-Forêt, and is a member of the Socialist Party.

References
Page on the Senate website

1935 births
Living people
French Senators of the Fifth Republic
Socialist Party (France) politicians
Officiers of the Ordre des Arts et des Lettres
Senators of Indre-et-Loire